is a Japanese professional marathon runner and a Goodwill Ambassador for the United Nations Population Fund (UNFPA).

Career
Arimori competed for Japan in the 1992 Summer Olympics held in Barcelona, Spain in the marathon where she won the silver medal with a time of 2:32:49, eight seconds behind Russian Valentina Yegorova who ran the race in 2:32:41. This hard-fought race was the closest finishing time in Olympic history for men or women at that time. At the 1996 Atlanta Olympics, Arimori returned to the Olympic marathon, where she won the bronze medal and finished behind Valentina Yegorova for a second time. Yegorova ran the race in 2:28:05. Arimori's time was 2:28:39. Although both runners ran four minutes faster than their previous Olympic race, they were beaten back by Ethiopian runner Fatuma Roba, who completed the race and won the gold medal with a time of 2:26:05.

Arimori was the first woman granted professional status by the Japanese Amateur Athletic Federation (JAAF), the nation's governing track and field association. She was granted this status in 1996, following her second and final appearance at the Olympic Games in Atlanta.

Achievements

Awards

Arimori was voted Japanese Athlete of the Year in 1992 and 1996.

Personal life
Arimori was born on December 17, 1966 in Okayama, Okayama Prefecture, Japan. 

Prior to the 1992 Olympics, Arimori participated in altitude training in Colorado.  She married Gabriel Wilson in January 1998 in Boulder, Colorado, United States. They separated one month after their marriage, and Wilson revealed his extensive debts and previous homosexual tendencies, admitting "I was gay", at a press conference. They officially divorced in July 2011.

See also
 Angkor Wat Marathon, a marathon introduced in 1996 by Yuko Arimori in Cambodia

References

External links

 IAAF profile
 Official blog 

1966 births
Japanese female marathon runners
Olympic female marathon runners
Olympic silver medalists for Japan
Olympic bronze medalists for Japan
Olympic athletes of Japan
Athletes (track and field) at the 1992 Summer Olympics
Athletes (track and field) at the 1996 Summer Olympics
Living people
Sportspeople from Okayama
Nippon Sport Science University alumni
Medalists at the 1996 Summer Olympics
Medalists at the 1992 Summer Olympics
Olympic silver medalists in athletics (track and field)
Olympic bronze medalists in athletics (track and field)